Nicholas A. Pucciarelli (January 1, 1923 – September 18, 1983) was a Democratic member of the Pennsylvania House of Representatives. He was in office from 1979 to 1982. He was born in Philadelphia. He died at a Philadelphia hospital in 1983 at the age of 60.

References

Democratic Party members of the Pennsylvania House of Representatives
1983 deaths
1923 births
Politicians from Philadelphia
20th-century American politicians